Delamere is a village and former civil parish, now in the parish of Delamere and Oakmere, in Cheshire West and Chester, England. It contains nine buildings that are recorded in the National Heritage List for England as designated listed buildings, all of which are listed at Grade II.  This grade is the lowest of the three gradings given to listed buildings and is applied to "buildings of national importance and special interest".  The largest physical features in the parish are Delamere Forest, and part of the Mid Cheshire Ridge.  Running through the parish are the A54 and A556 roads, and the Chester–Manchester railway line.  Other than Delamere Forest, the parish is entirely rural.  The listed buildings in the parish include two churches, a sundial and, on the former turnpike roads, two mileposts and two buildings that originated as toll houses.

See also
Listed buildings in Ashton Hayes
Listed buildings in Cuddington
Listed buildings in Kelsall
Listed buildings in Little Budworth
Listed buildings in Manley
Listed buildings in Norley
Listed buildings in Utkinton
Listed buildings in Whitegate and Marton
Listed buildings in Willington

References
Citations

Sources

Listed buildings in Cheshire West and Chester
Lists of listed buildings in Cheshire